Karvandar Rural District is a rural district (dehestan) in the Central District of Khash County, Sistan and Baluchestan province, Iran. At the 2006 census, its population was 6,028, in 1,287 families.  The rural district has 55 villages. At the 2016 census, its population was 7,153.

References 

Khash County
Rural Districts of Sistan and Baluchestan Province
Populated places in Khash County